This is a list of rulers of Prome (Pyay) from the end of Pagan period to the beginning of Restored Toungoo Dynasty of Burma (Myanmar). Strategically located at the border of the Hanthawaddy Kingdom, the city of Prome (Pyay) was governed closely by the central government throughout the Small Kingdoms period (1287–1555). Unlike in other locations, the high kings at Ava by and large did not allow hereditary viceroyship at Prome. A new governor, usually a senior prince close to the royal family, was appointed. The arrangement broke down in 1482 when the Prome Kingdom gained independence from Ava. In the early 17th century, Restored Toungoo kings abolished then existing hereditary viceroyships throughout the entire Irrawaddy valley. After Pye Min, the office became strictly an appointed mayoralty, with the title of the office changed to wun (mayor/minister) from hitherto prevalent titles min (viceroy) or ne-sa (governor).

List of rulers
The following list is per the standard Burmese chronicles Maha Yazawin and Hmannan Yazawin, unless otherwise noted. The Yazawin Thit chronicle reports a slightly different list. The summary lists of the rulers of Prome in both Maha Yazawin and Hmannan Yazawin are internally inconsistent in terms of dates with their own reporting in the narrative sections. See the individual articles for inconsistencies.

See also
 Prome Kingdom
 Sri Ksetra Kingdom
 List of Burmese monarchs
 List of rulers of Ava
 List of rulers of Martaban
 List of rulers of Pegu
 List of rulers of Toungoo

Notes

References

Bibliography
 
 
 

Prome